Hesenan is the name of a Kurdish tribe located in various parts of Kurdistan. The largest part of this tribe lives in Turkish Kurdistan. The Hesenan tribe took part in the Dersim rebellion in 1937.

Notable Heseni 

 Ferzende Beg
 Daham Miro
Seyid Rıza

References 

Agha, Shaikh and State: The Social and Political Structures of Kurdistan, Martin van Bruinessen
The Kurds: A Contemporary Overview, Philip G. Kreyenbroek, Stefan Sperl

External links 
 
 

Kurdish tribes